A Christmas gift is a gift given in celebration of Christmas. They are often exchanged on December 25th.

Christmas Gift may also refer to:

 Christmas gift (exclamation), an exclamation traced back as early as 1809 in the southern United States
 Christmas Gift (album), the album by Kokia
 A Christmas Gift, EP by Kylie Minogue, with tracks from Aphrodite
 A Christmas Gift, film by Will Vinton

See also 
 Christmas Present (disambiguation)
 Gift (disambiguation)